The Fifth Quarter was an Australian rules football post-game television program which began screening on Network Ten on 27 March 2004.

The show reviewed the Australian rules football competition, AFL. Following each game on Saturday night, two hosts discussed the games played up to then and also topical matters that had arisen during the week. Early in the show's life the two hosts were Michael Christian and Andrew Maher, but from 2008, it was hosted on a rotating basis, with either Maher or Christian being joined by one of Network Ten's other football commentators, Luke Darcy, Robert Walls, Malcolm Blight or Tom Harley. There were also interviews with players and coaches after the match. Players to be interviewed included Cheynee Stiller and Gary Ablett, Jr., and coaches included Brett Ratten, Mark Harvey and Jade Rawlings, who was interviewed after coaching the Richmond Football Club for the first time). Before becoming senior coach of the Brisbane Lions, Michael Voss was a regular on The Fifth Quarter.

In 2006, the show was merged into Network Ten's Saturday night AFL coverage, still hosted by Christian and Maher but not listed as a separate program.

A popular, long-running segment of the show was entitled "Saturday Specials", and highlighted outstanding marks, goals or other efforts that had taken place on the day just finished.  This segment featured Kasabian's "Fire" as the background music.

The show also took a look at nominees for the NAB AFL Rising Star Award, usually reviewing them four weeks at a time. At the end of the 2011 season, The Fifth Quarter was axed because Ten had lost AFL broadcast rights.

Network 10 original programming
Australian rules football television series
2004 Australian television series debuts
2011 Australian television series endings